The Ballad of Ayesha is the English translation of the book Ayeshamangal by Anisul Hoque.

The book is set in newly independent Bangladesh with severe political unrest. The main character of the book is Ayesha, whose husband has been sentenced to death and is missing.

Characters
 Ayesha
 Joynal Abedin, Ayesha's husband

References

Novels set in Bangladesh
2018 novels
Bangladeshi novels